Robert Byington (born April 29, 1966) is an American film director, screenwriter and actor living in Austin, Texas.  He is most noted for his films RSO (Registered Sex Offender) (2008), Harmony and Me (2009), Somebody Up There Likes Me (2012), winner of The Special Jury Prize at the 2012 Locarno Film Festival, 7 Chinese Brothers (2015) starring Jason Schwartzman, Olympia Dukakis and Tunde Adebimpe, and Infinity Baby (2017) starring Kieran Culkin, Nick Offerman, and Martin Starr. His most recent film, Frances Ferguson, premiered at South by Southwest in March 2019.

Career
Robert "Bob" Byington grew up in Lincoln, Nebraska.  He studied at the University of California, Santa Cruz and received a masters in American Studies at the University of Texas at Austin.  Byington directed his first film Shameless in 1996, and followed up with Olympia in 1998, which played on opening night of the South by Southwest Film Festival.  He then entered a decade long "God-imposed" hiatus before directing his next three films RSO (Registered Sex Offender) (2008), Harmony and Me (2009) and Somebody Up There Likes Me (2012).

Style and content

Byington's work has been called literate, bawdy, sardonic and quirky.  The Los Angeles Times described his film Harmony and Me as a "collision of joyous whimsy and bittersweet melancholy."  His work is occasionally lumped in with the larger mumblecore movement in part because of his appearance in Andrew Bujalski's film Beeswax and his use of actors, such as Bujalski, Justin Rice, and Alex Karpovsky, who appeared in movies carrying the mumblecore label.

Byington considers his films thematically different from mumblecore and has resisted the label.  Variety magazine agreed in its review of Harmony and Me describing Byington's work as "mumblecore without the mumble."  Unlike the extreme naturalistic dialogue of many mumblecore films, Byington's work leans towards exact dialogue and, according to Roger Ebert, "perfect timing" which is "unreasonably funny".  Filmmaker Magazine likened his rich humor to the New Hollywood comedies of the 1970s.

Byington often reuses performers, including Nick Offerman, Kristen Tucker, Pat Healy, Keith Poulson, Kevin Corrigan and Suzy Nakamura.  Offerman starred in Byington's film, Somebody Up There Likes Me, which premiered at the 2012 SXSW Film Festival in Austin, Texas.

Awards
 Harmony and Me
People's Choice Award for Best Narrative, Denver Film Festival
Somebody Up There Likes Me
Special Jury Prize, Locarno International Film Festival
7 Chinese Brothers
Founders Prize Special Award, Traverse City Film Festival
Infinity Baby
Best Narrative Feature, Woodstock Film Festival
Frances Ferguson
Best Narrative Feature, Sidewalk Film Festival
Jury Award Winner, Indianapolis International Film Festival

Michael Moore awarded Byington the Stanley Kubrick Award for "bold and innovative filmmaking" in 2009.

Filmography (as writer and director)
Shameless (1996)
Olympia (1998)
RSO [Registered Sex Offender] (2008)	
Harmony and Me (2009)
Slacker 2011 (2011) (segment)
Somebody Up There Likes Me (2012)
7 Chinese Brothers (2015)
Infinity Baby (2017)
Frances Ferguson (2020)

References

External links

 LA Times Review for "Somebody Up There Likes Me"
 Austin Chronicle Review for "Somebody Up There Likes Me"
 Austin Chronicle Review for "7 Chinese Brothers"
 Hollywood Reporter Review for "7 Chinese Brothers"
 The AFI Interview: Bob Byington
 Bedford + Bowery Review for "Infinity Baby"
 Now Streaming in Austin: "Frances Ferguson"
 SXSW Review for "Frances Ferguson"
 A Conversation with Bob Byington at Locarno 
 Filmmaker Magazine for "Somebody Up There Likes Me"
 AFS Presents: 7 CHINESE BROTHERS Q&A with Bob Byington and Jason Schwartzman

American film directors
Living people
1971 births